Seax-Wica or better Seax Witchcraft is a tradition, or denomination, inspired by the neopagan religion of Wicca. Specifically the Seax Witchcraft is largely inspired by the iconography of the historical Anglo-Saxon paganism, though, unlike Theodism, it is not a reconstruction of the early mediaeval religion itself.

The tradition was founded in 1973 by Raymond Buckland, an English-born high priest of Gardnerian Wicca who moved to the United States in the 1970s. His book, The Tree, was written with the intent for it to be a definitive guide to Seax-Wica, and was published in 1974 by Samuel Weiser, and subsequently republished in 2005 as Buckland's Book of Saxon Witchcraft.

The tradition primarily honours two principal deities: Woden, and Freya. These are seen as representations of the Wiccan deities of the Horned God and the Mother Goddess. The tradition uses a minimal set of ceremonial tools, including a spear. Runes are also significant.

Openness 
Seax-Wica does not employ any secrecy oath. Buckland's Book of Saxon Witchcraft was written in mind that the reader would already be well versed in the various techniques of Witchcraft and Wiccan ritual. However, Buckland has pointed out that his Complete Book of Witchcraft gives instructions on how to proceed when no tools are available. These instructions are enough to allow one to begin, self-initiate, and consecrate one's first tools.

Organisation 
Seax-Wica allows self-dedication as entry into its tradition, as well as solitary practice. In the Seax tradition, covens work by a form of democracy, electing, un-electing, and re-electing coven officers, the high priest and priestess. Within ritual settings, there are the thegn, a type of sergeant-at-arms/guard/watchman, who can also be responsible for the covenstead (the meeting place of the coven), or guarding a ceremony being performed; there is also a scribe/secretary, who keeps most, if not all, of the coven's records. The word "Thegn", or "Thane" is an Anglo-Saxon title (Anglo-Saxon: þeg(e)n meaning "a servant, one who does service for another.")

Buckland was not the head of the tradition, but is respected as its founder, and continued to practice and contribute to it, until his death on September 27, 2017.

See also 
Wicca
Raymond Buckland

References 

 

Wiccan traditions
1973 in religion
Germanic neopaganism
1970s in modern paganism

pt:Wica